CFAA may refer to:
 Canadian Fire Alarm Association
 Committee for Financial and Administrative Affairs of the European Union's Committee of the Regions
 Computer Fraud and Abuse Act
 Cooperative Forestry Assistance Act of 1978
 Custom Filter Anti-Aliasing